Bahupura Uparwar is a village in Deegh Mandal, Sant Ravidas Nagar District, Uttar Pradesh State. Bahupura Uparwar is located 39.7 km distance from its District Main City Gyanpur. It is located 222 km distance from its State Main City Lucknow.

Demographics 
As of 2001 India census, Sherpur had a population of 1013. Males constitute 53% (541) of the population and females 47% (472).

References 

Villages in Bhadohi district